Nitzan Atzmon competed for Israel and won gold medals in the men's standing volleyball events at the 1976 Summer Paralympics, the 1980 Summer Paralympics, and the 1984 Summer Paralympics.

He also competed in men's para athletics events. At the 1976 Summer Paralympics, he won a gold medal in the high jump F event and a silver medal in the long jump F event. At the 1980 Summer Paralympics, he won a bronze medal in the high jump F event.

See also 
 Israel at the 1976 Summer Paralympics
 Israel at the 1980 Summer Paralympics
 Israel at the 1984 Summer Paralympics

References

External links
 

Living people
Year of birth missing (living people)
Place of birth missing (living people)
Israeli men's volleyball players
Paralympic athletes of Israel
Paralympic volleyball players of Israel
Paralympic gold medalists for Israel
Paralympic silver medalists for Israel
Paralympic bronze medalists for Israel
Paralympic medalists in athletics (track and field)
Paralympic medalists in volleyball
Athletes (track and field) at the 1976 Summer Paralympics
Athletes (track and field) at the 1980 Summer Paralympics
Volleyball players at the 1976 Summer Paralympics
Volleyball players at the 1980 Summer Paralympics
Volleyball players at the 1984 Summer Paralympics
Medalists at the 1976 Summer Paralympics
Medalists at the 1980 Summer Paralympics
Medalists at the 1984 Summer Paralympics
Paralympic high jumpers
Paralympic long jumpers
Visually impaired high jumpers
Visually impaired long jumpers